Woodsia is a genus of lightfishes.

Species
There are currently two recognized species in this genus:
 Woodsia meyerwaardeni G. Krefft, 1973 (Austral lightfish)
 Woodsia nonsuchae (Beebe, 1932) (Bigeye lightfish)

References

Phosichthyidae
Marine fish genera